The 1970 Espirito Santo Trophy took place 30 September – 3 October at the Negro course at the R.S.H.E. Club de Campo in Madrid, Spain. Several years later, in the late 1970s, the course became home of the Club de Campo Villa de Madrid, while the R.S.H.E Club moved to another location, north of the Madrid city.

It was the fourth women's golf World Amateur Team Championship for the Espirito Santo Trophy. The tournament was a 72-hole stroke play team event with 22 three-woman teams. The best two scores for each round counted towards the team total.

The United States team won the Trophy, defending their title from two years ago and winning their third consecutive title, beating France by one stroke. France took the silver medal while South Africa, seven strokes further behind, for the first time on the podium in the championship, took the bronze.

Teams 
22 teams contested the event. Each team had three players.

Results 

Sources:

Individual leaders 
There was no official recognition for the lowest individual scores.

References

External link 
World Amateur Team Championships on International Golf Federation website

Espirito Santo Trophy
Golf tournaments in Spain
Espirito Santo Trophy
Espirito Santo Trophy
Espirito Santo Trophy
Espirito Santo Trophy